"Moment by Moment" is the title theme song to the 1978 Universal Pictures film Moment by Moment starring Lily Tomlin and John Travolta. It is written by Lee Holdridge and Molly-Ann Leikin and performed by American singer Yvonne Elliman. The song is featured twice on the film's soundtrack album, as the first track and reprised as the final track, including three instrumental versions.

The single's B-side, "Sailing Ships", is a song featured on Elliman's 1978 RSO Records album Night Flight.

Release and reception
Despite the film's commercial and critical failure, "Moment by Moment" was a considerable hit for Yvonne Elliman: it entered the US Billboard Hot 100 chart in December 1978 and peaked at #59 the following month, and also reached #32 on the Adult Contemporary chart in February 1979. In Canada, the song peaked at #18 on the RPM Adult Contemporary chart in April 1979.

Track listing
7" Vinyl
"Moment by Moment" (Lee Holdridge, Molly-Ann Leikin) – 3:19
"Sailing Ships" (Stephen Bishop) – 4:46

Personnel
Yvonne Elliman – lead vocals
Craig Doerge – keyboards
Russell Kunkel – drums
Richie Zito – guitar
Bob Glaub – bass
Sidney Sharp – concert master

Chart performance

References

1978 singles
1979 singles
Songs written for films
Film theme songs
Love themes
RSO Records singles
Yvonne Elliman songs
Pop ballads
Songs with music by Lee Holdridge